Sandra Meira Starling (16 January 1944 – 14 December 2021) was a Brazilian politician. A member of the Workers' Party, she served in the Chamber of Deputies from 1991 to 1999 and the Legislative Assembly of Minas Gerais from 1987 to 1991.

References
See article in Portuguese (updating)

1944 births
2021 deaths
Brazilian politicians
Workers' Party (Brazil) politicians
People from Belo Horizonte
Members of the Chamber of Deputies (Brazil) from Minas Gerais
Members of the Legislative Assembly of Minas Gerais